Paradaphoenus is a physically small bear dog, which inhabited North America from the Early Oligocene to the Middle Miocene,   33.3—15.97 Ma, existing for approximately . Fossils have been found at Haystack, Oregon, Banner County, Nebraska, Dawes County, Nebraska, and Sheep Mtn, South Dakota.

Sources

Cenozoic mammals of North America
Bear dogs
Miocene carnivorans
Burdigalian genus extinctions
Rupelian genus first appearances
Prehistoric carnivoran genera